The Police, known as Alamn Alaam from the 2008/2009 season,;() is a Libyan football club based in Tripoli, Libya. The club was founded in 1957 as Aschourta (The Police) but changed its name to Ittihad Alamn Alaam (Public Security United) in 2007. The club was promoted from the Libyan Second Division last season, having finished 1st in Group B last year.
In 2008–09 the club was relegated and it is expected that leading players will leave the club. Juan Ramirez Cuzo became the 1st player to leave the club in the summer of 2009.

Football clubs in Libya
1957 establishments in Libya
Association football clubs established in 1957